The 1934–35 Michigan Wolverines men's ice hockey team represented the University of Michigan in college ice hockey. In its eighth year under head coach Ed Lowrey, the team won the Big Ten Conference ice hockey championship, compiled a 12–3–2 record (4–0–2 conference), and outscored all opponents 60 to 30.

Left wing Johnny Sherf and goalie John Jewell were the team's senior co-captains. Jewell left the team during the season for an appendectomy.  He was replaced in goal by Bill Chase.

Sherf scored more goals during the 1934–35 season than all of Michigan's opponents combined.  He scored four goals in the opening game of the season against the Essex Frontiers.  During a two-game series on the road against Minnesota in January 1935, Sherf played the entire 140 minutes of both games (including overtime) "without a penalty and with relief only to change sticks."  Sherf later played for the Detroit Red Wings and in 1937 became the first U.S. citizen to have his name engraved on the Stanley Cup.  Michigan's sophomore center Vic Heyliger also went on to play for the Chicago Blackhawks and later returned to Ann Arbor as the Wolverine's hockey coach from 1944 to 1957.

With a record of 4–0–2 against Big Ten Conference opponents, the 1934–35 Wolverines won the conference championship, the first conference championship won by a Michigan athletic team since the spring of 1934. After watching Michigan defeat Minnesota on February 23, 1935, to win the conference championship, athletic director Fielding H. Yost said, "Now we've got a championship! Did you see how Sherf outsmarted 'em for the last goal? That boy's a real athlete! A real Meechigan athlete!"  The Wolverines broke Minnesota's streak of having won four consecutive Big Ten ice hockey championships.

The Wolverines concluded the season with an 8-3 victory over the St. Thomas Athletic Club.  The eight goals in the game was the most scored in "a major game" at the Ann Arbor Coliseum up to that point.

At the end of the season, three Michigan players, left wing Johnny Sherf, center Vic Heyliger, and defenseman Donald MacCollum, were selected to the All-Midwest team.

Standings

Schedule
During the season, Michigan compiled a 12–3–2.  Its schedule was as follows.

Roster and scoring statistics
Eight members of the 1934-35 Michigan hockey team received an "M" for their participation on the team.  They are indicated in bold below.  Two other players, Edward Chase and Jack Merrill received varsity numerals.  Sampson J. Smith received the manager's award.

References

Michigan Wolverines men's ice hockey seasons
Michigan
Michigan
Michigan
Michigan